Drosera huegelii, the bold sundew, is an erect perennial tuberous species in the carnivorous plant genus Drosera that is endemic to Western Australia. It grows in sandy soils in winter-wet depressions and margins of swamps and occurs along the south-west coast of Australia. White to cream-coloured flowers emerge from June to September.

D. huegelii was first described and named by Stephan Endlicher in his 1837 publication Enumeratio plantarum.

See also
List of Drosera species

References

Carnivorous plants of Australia
Caryophyllales of Australia
Eudicots of Western Australia
Plants described in 1837
huegelii